Rasmus Morten Andersen (25 September 1861 – 28 February 1930) was a Danish sculptor. He is mainly known for his naturalistic portraits.

Early life and education
Rasmus Andersen was born at Ørting, near Horsens, the son of Niels Andersen and Johanne Mortensdatter Andersen. He trained as a wood carver. He attended the Royal Danish Academy of Fine Arts from 1877 to 1884 and trained to become a sculptor at Wilhelm Bissen's studio.

Career
Andersen had his debut at the Charlottenborg Spring Exhibition in 1882. He won the Academy's small gold medal for the relief Eumaios in 1884. He participated in the World's Columbian Exposition in 1893 as well as a number of major Danish exhibitions. Throughout his career, he specialized in portraits, both in the form of statues, busts and medallions. His statue of Enrico Dalgas was awarded the Eckersberg Medal in 1900 and a bronze cast of it was erected in Aarhus in 1901.

Andersen worked as a conservator at the Art Academy's cast collection until 1905 and at Thorvaldsens Museum from 1893 until his death.

Personal life
Andersen married Karen Sofie Nielsen (1863–1929). The couple had three daughters: Gerda Andersen; Valborg Andersen and Karen Margrethe Andersen. He died at Frederiksberg and was buried in Solbjerg Park Cemetery.

Selected works
Works include:

Statues

 Hans Christian Andersen, Chicago, US (1889)
 E.V. Dalgas, Aarhus (1901, executed 1900)
 J.C. la Cour, Lyngby (1903)
 L. Brockenhuus-Schack, Svendborg (1904)
 C.F.Tietgen, Sankt Annæ Plads, Copenhagen (1905 at Børsen)
 Chresten Berg, Kolding (1906)
 Christian IX, Nykøbing Mors, (1909)
 Lensbaron Zytphen-Adeler, Faarevejle (1928)

Busts
 Hans Krüger (1884, Ribe)
 Th. Stein (1890, bronze for Frederiksborg Museum, marble 1903 for Ny Carlsberg Glyptotek)
 H.A. Brendekilde (plaster 1901, Fyns Kunstmus.)
 Frederik VIII (marble 1908, Frederiksborg Museum)
 Wilhelm Wiehe (marble 1924, Royal Danish Theatre, original model in Teatermus.)
 Christian X (DFDS.)
 Hendrik Pontoppidan (1903, Aarhus)
 C.T. Barfoed (Landbohøjsk.)
 H.V. Stockfleth (Landbohøjsk.)
 E. Rostrup (Landbohøjsk)
 T. Westermann (Landbohøjsk)
 Otto Vaupell (Kolding Slotsbanke)
 W. Johannsen (Botanisk Lab.)
 Chr. Berg (Bogø)
 Ludvig Schrøder

Reliefs
 Otto Vaupell
 (Kolding, 1900)
 J.P. Michelsen (Herning)
 Sigurd Berg (Skjern, 1923)

References

External links

 Rasmus Andersen at geni.com
 Public art at Rasmus Andersen

1861 births
1930 deaths
People from Odder Municipality
Royal Danish Academy of Fine Arts alumni
20th-century Danish sculptors
Male sculptors
20th-century Danish male artists
19th-century Danish sculptors
19th-century Danish male artists
Recipients of the Medal of Merit (Denmark)
Recipients of the Eckersberg Medal
Knights of the Order of the Dannebrog
Danish male artists